New Zealand competed at the 1972 Summer Olympics in Munich, West Germany. For the first time at the Olympics, God Defend New Zealand was played instead of God Save the King/Queen. The New Zealand Olympic Committee was represented by 89 competitors, 82 men and 7 women, who took part in 63 events in 14 sports.

Medal tables

Archery

In the first modern archery competition at the Olympics, New Zealand entered one man in the competition.

Athletics

Track and road

Field

Boxing

Canoeing

Cycling

Eight cyclists represented New Zealand in 1972.

Road
Men's individual road race

Track
Men's 1000 m time trial

Men's team pursuit

Brent Pascoe was the reserve rider, but did not compete.

Gymnastics

Men's individual
Apparatus qualifying and all-around

Sale did not qualify for any of the apparatus finals.

Women's individual
Apparatus qualifying and all-around

Foote did not qualify for any of the apparatus finals.

Field hockey

Men's tournament
Team roster

Head coach
Ross Gillespie

Group B

9th / 10th Place play-off

New Zealand finished the men's field hockey tournament in ninth place.

Judo

Rowing

1972 was the last year that only men competed at the Olympic rowing events. New Zealand entered boats in four of the seven events. The gold medal won by the 1972 New Zealand eight is one of New Zealand's most memorable performances, and was in 2008 rated by sports journalist Joseph Romanos as New Zealand's best ever team performance at the Olympic Games.

Sailing 

Jonty Farmer, Jack Hansen, Geoff Smals and Bryan Treleaven were named as alternates but did not compete.

Shooting

Four male shooters represented New Zealand in 1972.

Mixed 25 m rapid fire pistol

Mixed 50 m rifle, prone

Mixed 50 m running target

Swimming

Weightlifting

Wrestling

Officials
 Chef de Mission – Joe McManemin
 Assistant team manager – Jack Prestney
 Team doctor – Tom Anderson
 Chaperone – Doris Fitzsimmons
 Archery section manager – Jack Richards
 Athletics
 Section manager – Graham Davy
 Coach – Valdemars Briedis
 Boxing section manager – David Tipping
 Canoeing section manager – Stan Robinson
 Cycling
 Section manager – Colin Hollows
 Coach / mechanic – Bruce Goldsworthy
 Field hockey
 Section manager – Merv Good
 Coach – Ross Gillespie
 Gymnastics section manager – Cameron A. R. Buchanan
 Judo section manager – Jack Fielding
 Rowing
 Section manager – Fred Strachan
 Coach – Rusty Robertson
 Assistant coach – Ted Lindstrom
 Sailing section manager – Hal Wagstaff
 Shooting section manager – Hong Tse
 Swimming
 Section manager – Graeme Brockett
 Coach – Pic Parkhouse
 Weightlifting
 Section manager – Peter Watson
 Coach – Paul Newberry
 Wrestling section manager – Art Pickering

References

Nations at the 1972 Summer Olympics
1972 Summer Olympics
Summer Olympics